The Athletics at the 2016 Summer Paralympics – Women's 200 metres T47 event at the 2016 Paralympic Games took place on 16 September 2016, at the Estádio Olímpico João Havelange.

Heats

Heat 1 
18:33 15 September 2016:

Heat 2 
18:39 15 September 2016:

Final 
11:27 16 September 2016:

Notes

Athletics at the 2016 Summer Paralympics